Steve Gist is an American politician from Montana. He is a Republican member of the Montana House of Representatives for district 25.

References 

Year of birth missing (living people)
Living people
Republican Party members of the Montana House of Representatives